Palaea Historica ("Old Testament History") is an anonymous ninth century AD Byzantine chronicle which retells and expands on events in the Hebrew Bible. The Greek text of Palaea survives in manuscripts dating from the 12th to 16th centuries as well as a Slavonic translation. The work is of particular interest for biblical studies because of its recasting of Old Testament personalities such as Melchizedek, Abraham, and  Moses in addition to its inclusion of extra-biblical material alluded to in the New Testament, for example Jannes and Jambres (2 Timothy 3:8) and Archangel Michael contesting for the body of Moses (Jude 1:9). It contains a version of the Story of Melchizedek.

Text 
The opening in Greek as in found in Vassiliev's 1893 edition reads as follows:Ἱστορία παλαιοῦ περιέχων ἀπὸ τοῦ ᾿Αδάμ.

Πρὸ πάντων καὶ up πάντων [χαὶ] διὰ πάντων χρὴ τὸν

ἀληθῆ χριστιανὸν ἐπιγνῶναι τίς θεός χαὶ οσαχως θεός

[καὶ χατὰ τί εἴρηται θεός]. Θεὸς ὁ πατὴρ ὁ ἄναρχος...

See also 
 Historia scholastica
 Biblia pauperum

Further reading 
 William Adler, "Parabiblical Traditions and Their Use in the Palaea Historica", in Tradition, Transmission, and Transformation from Second Temple Literature through Judaism and Christianity in Late Antiquity, ed. Menahem Kister et al. (Leiden ; Boston: Brill, 2015), 1–39. 
David Flusser, "Palaea Historica: An Unknown Source of Biblical Legends", in Studies in Aggadah and Folk-Literature, eds. J. Heinemann and D. Noy (Jerusalem: Magnes Press, 1971),

Notes

External links 
 A. Vassiliev, Anecdota Graeco-Byzantina (Moscow: Moscow University, 1893), pp. 188-292.
Byzantine chronicles
Medieval legends
Biblical paraphrases
9th-century Christian texts